Tallon Griekspoor was the defending champion but chose not to defend his title.

Márton Fucsovics won the title after defeating Fábián Marozsán 6–2, 6–4 in the final.

Seeds

Draw

Finals

Top half

Bottom half

References

External links
Main draw
Qualifying draw

Slovak Open - 1
2022 Singles